Dorothy West (1907–1998) was an American novelist and short story writer.

Dorothy West may also refer to:
Dorothy West (actress) (1891–1980), American actress
Dottie West (1932–1991), American country music singer
Dot West, indigenous Australian screenwriter